Seduce the Heaven is a Greek melodic death/power metal band from Athens.

Biography
Seduce the Heaven was formed in mid-2009 by guitarist Alex Flouros and soon joined by the lyrical soprano Elina Laivera on vocals founding in this way the main structure of the band. In the following months, a full album consisting of 10 tracks had already been prepared for the recording process.

The band is combining powerful elements of melodic/death, metalcore, power and symphonic elements in a unique, technical and brutal, yet very melodic way. Their debut album Field of Dreams covers a wide range of musical styles moving from progressive to Pantera-like paths, from the bursting trails of NWOAHM and bands like Killswitch Engage to the powerful breakouts of the Swedish melodic death metal scene. What is also special about the sound of Seduce the Heaven is the combination of two charismatic vocalists exchanging duos of male growl vocals (Marios Mizo) and female clean vocals (Elina Laivera) that move from rock to lyrical paths delivering also a gothic note onto a massive setting of wave-crashing guitars, drums and bass. Jazz harmonies, 80's influences, dark, aggressive, straight in-your-face blast of power, melody and atmosphere. Seduce the Heaven is a unique fusion for fans of many sides of the metal battlefield.

Earlier, the band had released a promo CD only for the media, including 5 songs from the upcoming debut album. Receiving laudatory reviews, the band released their first official video clip Illusive Light, which premiered on February 23, 2012. The band's debut on stage took place in Athens, GR supporting Epica in 2012. October 2012 found the band performing for the first time abroad at the Metal Female Voices Festival X in Belgium with huge names of the female fronted metal scene, like Arch Enemy, Lacuna Coil, Epica and others, receiving amazing feedback from fans and critics.

The band self-released their debut album Field of Dreams officially on January 15, 2013 under the distribution of the Belgian label FYB Records. On the same day, the band launched a video clip for the song Reflection. Not much later, the band signed an official contract with Japanese label Spinning Records (The Agonist, In This Moment, Aldious and others).

The official release date of Field of Dreams in Japan has been scheduled for February 20, 2013. So far, the band has been hosted on a big number of important magazines and webzines worldwide (including Metal Hammer Greece, Hard Rock France, Burrn! Japan), on radio stations and TV shows. They have been performing all around Europe.

Band members

Current members
 Christos Kollias – bass guitars (2009–present)
 Alex Flouros – guitars (2009–present)
 Marios Mizo – male growled vocals (2012–present)
 Angel Wolf-Black – female vocals (2013–present)
 Panos Geo – drums (2015–present)

Past members
 John Thomas – drums (2009–2013)
 Vagelis Kolios – male growled vocals (2009–2012)
 Elina Laivera – female clean vocals (2009–2013)
 Simos Konstantinidis – drums (2013-2015)
 Sinnik Al – guitars (live) (2011–2013), guitars (2013-2015)

Touring members
 John McRis – guitars (live) (2009–2011)

Discography

Studio albums
 2013: Field of Dreams

EPs
 2011: Seduce the Heaven

Singles
 2013: "Reflection" 
 2013: "This War Called Home"
 2013: "Believe in Me"

Music videos
 2012: "Illusive Light"
 2013: "Reflection"
 2013: "Leave Me Alone"

References

External links

 Official website
 Last.fm

Greek melodic death metal musical groups
2009 establishments in Greece
Musical groups from Athens